Puttintiki Raa Chelli is a 2004 Indian Telugu-language drama film directed by Kodi Ramakrishna and produced by R. S. Goud and Basavraj. It stars Arjun, Meena and Madhumitha (credited as Swati). It was released on 14 April 2004, became a super hit at the box office and was dubbed and released in Tamil as Anbu Sagotharan with comedy track reshot with Manivannan, Senthil and Shakeela. The movie is a remake of the 2002 Kannada film Thavarige Baa Thangi. The movie became super hit at the box-office.

Cast 

 Arjun Sarja as Sivanna 
 Meena
 Swati as Lakshmi
 Srinath as Ajay
 Hema Choudhary as Kantham
 Pragathi as Sivanna and Lakshmi's mother
 Sivaji Raja
 Costumes Krishna
 Dharmavarapu Subramanyam
 Ananth Raj
 Jyothi
 Shakeela
 Kusumuri
 Sudhakar
 Surya
 Apoorva
 Shanoor Sana
 Kalpana Rai
 Suma

In the Tamil version Anbu Sagotharan, the comedy track of Dharmavarapu Subramanyam, Sudhakar and Shakila has been re-shot with Manivannan, Senthil and Shakila.

Soundtrack 
The soundtrack was composed by S. A. Rajkumar and the lyrics were penned by Sai Sri Harsha & Surendra Krishna. "Chaamanthi Poobanthi" was reused again by Rajkumar as "Kandamma Kandamma" in Kannada film Maharaja for which K. S. Chithra won the Karanataka State Award. All songs were sung by eminent singers like K. S. Chithra, S. P. Balasubrahmanyam, Udit Narayan, Sujatha Mohan, Mano etc.
Telugu version

Tamil version
Lyrics - Pa. Vijay
Thaai Veettukku - Mano, Sujatha
Gopala Gopala - Karthik, Malathi
Aagaya Suriyane - S. A. Rajkumar, Sujatha
Saamanthi - Unni Menon
Dindukkal Poottu - Karthik, Kalpana
Vanavil Pole - Mano, Vidya

References

External links 
 
 Puttintiki Ra Chelli on Saavn

2004 films
2004 drama films
Indian drama films
Films directed by Kodi Ramakrishna
Films scored by S. A. Rajkumar
Telugu remakes of Kannada films